Despite Donald Johnson and Piet Norval being the defending champions, only Johnson competed that year with Jared Palmer.

Johnson and Palmer won in the final 6–4, 6–2 against Paul Hanley and Andrew Kratzmann.

Seeds

  Donald Johnson /  Jared Palmer (champions)
  Ellis Ferreira /  Rick Leach (quarterfinals)
  Michael Hill /  Kevin Ullyett (quarterfinals)
  Scott Humphries /  Brian MacPhie (first round)

Draw

External links
 2001 Nottingham Open Doubles draw

Nottingham Open
2001 ATP Tour